Anne was an American dream pop band from Portland, Oregon.

History
Anne began in 2010 with the release of a demo. Following this, they released a mixtape titled Mixtape One. In 2011, Anne released their first full-length album, Dream Punx, via A389 Recordings. In 2012, Anne released a split with the band Whirr. In 2012, Anne released an EP on Run for Cover Records titled Power Exchange. In 2013, Anne released an EP titled Jerusalem. In 2014, Anne released their second full-length album titled Pulling Chain via Run for Cover Records.

Band members
David Lindell (Vocals/Instrumentation) 
Andrew Zilar (Drums) 
Jared Ridabok (Drums)

Discography
Studio albums
Dream Punx (2011, A389 Recordings)
Pulling Chain (2014, Run for Cover)
EPs
Power Exchange (2012, Run for Cover)
Splits
Anne/Whirr (2012, Run for Cover)
Mixtapes
Mixtape One (2010, self-released)
Mixtape Two (2012, Run for Cover)
Demos
Demo (2010, self-released)

References

Run for Cover Records artists
Musical groups from Portland, Oregon
Musical groups established in 2010
2010 establishments in Oregon